Ronald Fenton (21 September 1940 – 25 September 2013) was an English football player, coach and manager. He played as an inside forward and made nearly 200 appearances in the Football League.

Fenton was born in South Shields, and began his football career with his home town club before joining Burnley as a junior. He moved to West Bromwich Albion in 1962, later playing for Birmingham City and finally Brentford, for whom he acted as caretaker manager after the sudden departure of Jimmy Sirrel to Notts County.

After finishing his playing career, he followed Jimmy Sirrel to join the coaching staff at Notts County. After Sirrel moved to Sheffield United, he became County manager for two years before being replaced by Sirrel again.

After leaving County, Fenton joined Nottingham Forest where he spent ten years on the coaching staff and a further six as assistant manager under Brian Clough.

References
Career stats

General

1940 births
2013 deaths
Footballers from South Shields
English footballers
Association football forwards
Burnley F.C. players
West Bromwich Albion F.C. players
Birmingham City F.C. players
Brentford F.C. players
Notts County F.C. players
English Football League players
Brentford F.C. managers
English football managers
Notts County F.C. managers
English Football League managers